Greatest Hits is the first greatest hits album by American singer-songwriter Jewel. The album was released on February 5, 2013, and features duets from Kelly Clarkson and the Pistol Annies. It also contains one new recording, "Two Hearts Breaking".

Track listing

Chart performance

References

2013 greatest hits albums
Jewel (singer) albums
Rhino Entertainment compilation albums